Shekhar Govindrao Nikam is a leader of Nationalist Congress Party and a member of the Maharashtra Legislative Assembly elected from Chiplun Assembly constituency in Ratnagiri city.

Positions held
 2019: Elected to Maharashtra Legislative Assembly.

References

1966 births
Living people
Members of the Maharashtra Legislative Assembly
Nationalist Congress Party politicians from Maharashtra
People from Ratnagiri